Le Buisson-de-Cadouin is a commune in the Dordogne department in southwestern France. It is situated on the left bank of the river Dordogne. The Gare du Buisson is a railway junction, with connections to Bordeaux, Sarlat-la-Canéda, Agen and Périgueux.

History
In 1893, the commune of Cabans was renamed Le Buisson. In 1960, Cussac and Le Buisson merged to form Le Buisson-Cussac. In 1974, the communes Cadouin, Le Buisson-Cussac, Paleyrac and Urval merged and formed the new commune Le-Buisson-de-Cadouin. Urval separated in 1989.

Cadouin Abbey (founded in 1115, dissolved in 1791) was formerly situated here.

Population

Demographics
 Students: 4.05%
 Single-parent families: 10.39%

Occupation
Agriculture: 4%
Commercial and manufacturing: 12%
Services: 8%
Intermediary professions: 14%
Employees: 36%
Labourers: 25%

Sights
 Grotte de Cussac, a cave containing more than 100 prehistoric artworks
 Cadouin Abbey, 12th-century Cistercian monastery
 Jardin de Planbuisson

See also
Communes of the Dordogne department

References

External links

 Buisson-de-Cadouin Le Buisson-de-Cadouin on the Quid site

Communes of Dordogne
World Heritage Sites in France